Eileen M. Bulger MD, FACS is the Chief of Trauma at Harborview Medical Center and Professor of Surgery at University of Washington.

Education 
Bulger graduated from Cornell University Medical College in 1992. Afterward, she completed her residency in general surgery at the University of Washington, where she remained to complete a fellowship in critical care medicine. Bulger is double board certified in surgery and surgical critical care by the American Board of Surgery.

Career 
Bulger was appointed the Chair of the American College of Surgeons Committee on Trauma in 2018.

Research 
Bulger's research is focused on novel ways to treat the injured, streamlining prehospital care, testing new approaches to necrotizing soft tissue infections, and developing a National Trauma Research action plan for the United States. Her research has been funded by the National Institutes of Health, the United States Department of Defense, and Medic One Foundation. 

Bulger has published 359 peer-reviewed articles.

References 

Living people
Year of birth missing (living people)
Cornell University alumni
University of Washington faculty
American surgeons
Women surgeons